The Río de la Miel is a short river in the south of Spain, emptying into the Bay of Gibraltar at Algeciras. It falls over a distance of 350 metres including some waterfalls and working water mills. As the port of Algeciras expanded, docks on the river became marooned inland, and within the town much of the river is now culverted.

The literal translation of the name is the honey river.

References

Spanish site with historic photographs

Los Alcornocales Natural Park
Algeciras
Geography of the Province of Cádiz